Roger Beauchamp may refer to:

Roger de Beauchamp ( 1295–1304), MP for New Shoreham
Roger Beauchamp, 1st Baron Beauchamp of Bletso ( 1315–1380), English soldier and peer
Sir Roger Beauchamp (died c. 1373), son of the 1st Baron Beauchamp and father to the 2nd Baron Beauchamp